The Bowie Canyon is a submarine canyon located in the Bering Sea.   It is a submerged line of demarkation between the  Bowers Ridge and the Aleutian Ridge.   At its deepest point, it is 1.3 miles deep.   It is named after American geodetic engineer, William Bowie.

References

Submarine canyons of the Bering Sea